Keener-Johnson Farm is a historic farmhouse in Seymour, Tennessee, U.S.. It was built circa 1853 for  Adam Harvey Keener. It has been listed on the National Register of Historic Places since March 18, 1999.

References

Houses on the National Register of Historic Places in Tennessee
Greek Revival architecture in Tennessee
Houses completed in 1853
Houses in Sevier County, Tennessee
Historic districts on the National Register of Historic Places in Tennessee
1853 establishments in Tennessee